Wellington is a village in Lorain County, Ohio. The population was 4,799 at the time of the 2020 census.

History
Some say the village was named after William Welling, a local resident, while others believe the name is derived from the title of the Duke of Wellington.

Wellington was incorporated as a village in 1855.

In 1858, the former American House Hotel (later torn down and replaced by Herrick Memorial Library) was the site of the Oberlin-Wellington Rescue. A group of men, both white and black and many from Oberlin, swarmed the hotel to rescue runaway slave John Price. He was being held by a US Marshal and his men, who intended to return him to his master in Kentucky.

The abolitionists transported Price out of town en route to the Underground Railroad and helped convey him to Canada. Thirty-seven men were indicted, but only two, Simeon M. Bushnell and Charles Henry Langston, were tried in federal court for interfering with the marshal in carrying out the Fugitive Slave Law. After Langston's eloquent speech about slavery and discrimination, the judge gave them light sentences. The events and trial received national attention, and kept the issue of slavery at the forefront of debate.

Archibald M. Willard, painter of the patriotic Spirit of '76 painting, lived in Wellington during the 19th century. He is buried in Greenwood Cemetery on the outskirts of the village. The Spirit of '76 Museum, also located in Wellington, is dedicated to Willard and the history of Wellington. The original drum and fife used as models in the painting are also on display.

On New Year's Day, 1951, two eleven-year-old boys, Gerald Kordelsky and William Flood, accidentally drowned in an abandoned well at Chismar Farm in Wellington.

In 2010, Wellington was named the "Best Old House Neighborhood" for the state of Ohio by This Old House Magazine in their annual feature article.

Geography
Wellington is located at the intersection of State Routes 18 and 58.

Demographics

2010 census
As of the census of 2010, there were 4,802 people, 1,956 households, and 1,266 families living in the village. The racial makeup of the village was 95.8% White, 1.2% African American, 0.3% Native American, 0.4% Asian, 0.5% from other races, and 1.8% from two or more races. Hispanic or Latino people of any race were 2.0% of the population.

There were 1,956 households, of which 32.7% had children under the age of 18 living with them, 45.8% were married couples living together, 12.8% had a female householder with no husband present, 6.1% had a male householder with no wife present, and 35.3% were non-families. 30.7% of all households were made up of individuals, and 14.4% had someone living alone who was 65 years of age or older. The average household size was 2.39 and the average family size was 2.98.

The median age in the village was 39.5 years. 24.9% of residents were under the age of 18; 7.5% were between the ages of 18 and 24; 25.5% were from 25 to 44; 25.1% were from 45 to 64; and 17% were 65 years of age or older. The gender makeup of the village was 47.9% male and 52.1% female.

2000 census
As of the census of 2000, there were 4,511 people, 1,723 households, and 1,173 families living in the village. The population density was 1,536.2 people per square mile (592.4/km). There were 1,850 housing units at an average density of 630.0 per square mile (243.0/km). The racial makeup of the village was 97.14% White, 1.33% African American, 0.27% Native American, 0.13% Asian, 0.02% Pacific Islander, 0.20% from other races, and 0.91% from two or more races. Hispanic or Latino people of any race were 1.04% of the population.

There were 1,723 households, out of which 34.4% had children under the age of 18 living with them, 51.9% were married couples living together, 11.4% had a female householder with no husband present, and 31.9% were non-families. 27.3% of all households were made up of individuals, and 13.7% had someone living alone who was 65 years of age or older. The average household size was 2.52 and the average family size was 3.07.

In the village, the population was spread out, with 27.2% under the age of 18, 8.4% from 18 to 24, 29.0% from 25 to 44, 19.3% from 45 to 64, and 16.1% who were 65 years of age or older. The median age was 35 years. For every 100 females there were 93.0 males. For every 100 females age 18 and over, there were 87.8 males.

The median income for a household in the village was $41,250, and the median income for a family was $45,460. Males had a median income of $35,385 versus $23,488 for females. The per capita income for the village was $17,566. About 3.3% of families and 8.1% of the population were below the poverty line, including 11.8% of those under age 18 and 9.3% of those age 65 or over.

Government

Hans M. Schneider is the current mayor, elected to a four-year term in November 2015 and re-elected in November 2019. The Village Administrator is Steve Dupee, the Finance Director is Vanya Hales and the Village Solicitor is Stephen Bond. Gene Hartman (council term through December 31, 2021) is current Council President for 2018. Other members of the council are Guy Wells (through December 31, 2023), Helen Dronsfield (through December 31, 2023), Mark Bughman (through December 31, 2023), Keith Rowland (through December 31, 2021) and William Bogan (through December 31, 2021).

Wellington's Herrick Memorial Library loaned more than 86,000 items to its 9,000 cardholders in 2005. Total holdings as of 2005 were over 57,000 volumes with over 165 periodical subscriptions.

Wellington lies within the 7th congressional district, represented by Bob Gibbs.

Education

Wellington is served by the Wellington Exempted Village School District (WEVSD), including the McCormick Middle School and Wellington High School.

Festivals and events
Every June, the Ohio Scottish Games come to the Lorain County Fair Grounds to celebrate Scotland's rich history and culture.

In the late 19th century, Wellington was known as the "Cheese Capital of the World", and had a Heritage Cheese Festival in past years.

Two weeks before Labor Day, in late August, the Lorain County Fair, one of the biggest county fairs in the state of Ohio, takes place west of town on State Route 18 at the fairgrounds.

Each September since 1983, the Friends of the Herrick Memorial Library have sponsored the Harvest of the Arts, a large juried arts festival held on the town square. The event attracts more than 100 artisans and craftspeople and includes live musical performances, children's activities, and the raffle of a handmade quilt. All proceeds from the event support public programming at the library.

In popular culture
 The Walking Dead: Season Two by Telltale Games features a digitized version of the village. It appears at the end of episode five, "No Going Back", when Clementine, Kenny and Alvin Jr. travel from the Southern United States to the town, an established safe zone where a large number of people have taken refuge during a zombie apocalypse.
 Some scenes in the 2022 film White Noise, based on the Don DeLillo novel, were filmed in Wellington.

Sister city
Wellington has one sister city, as designated by the Sister Cities International:

 Crieff, Scotland, United Kingdom

Notable people
 Edna Allyn, librarian
 Leonard Warden Bonney, aviator
 William Byron Colver, chairman of the Federal Trade Commission
 JT Daly, musician, producer, and songwriter
 Dana McKenzie, NFL official
 Ken Onion, knife-maker
 Daniel Petric, murderer
 Lois Sheffield, baseball player for the South Bend Blue Sox
 Jack Wadsworth, MLB pitcher
 S. S. Warner, former Ohio state treasurer
 Carl S. Williams, former NFL player and ophthalmologist

References

External links
 Village website

 
Villages in Lorain County, Ohio
Villages in Ohio
Populated places established in 1818
Scottish-American culture in Ohio
1818 establishments in Ohio